Ondráček (feminine Ondráčková) is a Czech surname. It stems from the male given name Andrew. Notable people include:

Jiří Ondráček (1988), Czech ice hockey player
Michal Ondráček (1973), Czech footballer

See also 
 Vondráček, another variant of this surname

References 

Czech-language surnames
Patronymic surnames
Surnames from given names